Tomsk Bogashevo Airport  is an airport that serves Tomsk, Russia. It is located approximately 20 km south-east of Tomsk city center, near the village Bogashevo in Tomsky District of Tomsk Oblast.

History
The airport opened in November 1967 and replaced another airport within the Kashtak district in the city of Tomsk.  The Kashtak site was rebuilt with multistory apartment buildings and turned into a bedroom community of Tomsk.

In 2004 and 2005, the passenger terminal and the open space in front of the airport were reconstructed at a cost of 70 million roubles.

Construction of a new runway and facilities for flights to Central Asia began in 2006.  The construction budget for 2006 totaled 120 million roubles.

In fall 2006, construction began on a new road connecting Bogashevo to the Akademgorodok scientific research district.

In 2020, Russian politician and government critic Alexey Navalny fell ill after drinking tea in the airport cafe. He was scheduled to fly home to Moscow. It is believed the cup of tea was poisoned and he fell unconscious, with the plane diverting to Omsk instead.

In 2021, a 2.5 billion ruble contract was signed for the construction of a new domestic passenger terminal, scheduled to be completed by March 2023.

In 2019, passenger traffic totaled 750 thousand people, with traffic expecting to double by 2025.

Airlines and destinations

Accidents 
On 16 July 2021, on SiLA Airlines Flight 42, a failure of both engines of the turboprop plane An-28 occurred while en route from Kedrovy to Tomsk. At an emergency landing in a swamp, the plane was severely damaged — but all the passengers and crew members survived with minimal injures.

See also
 Kemerovo Airport

References

External links
 Tomsk Airport official website
Great Circle Mapper: TOF / UNTT - Tomsk, Tomsk, Russian Federation (Russia)
ASN Accident History for UNTT
Tomsk Bogashevo Airport at Russian Airports Database

Airports built in the Soviet Union
Airports in Tomsk Oblast
Novaport